Robert B. Rivkin (born January 9, 1956), better known by the stage name Bobby Z., is an American musician and record producer, most known as being the original drummer for Prince's backing band The Revolution from 1978 to 1986.

Life and career

Early life
Rivkin began his musical career at the age of six, playing several different instruments before finally settling on the drums. In junior high school, he formed a small touring band in the Minneapolis area that included future Chicago Bears football coach Marc Trestman on rhythm guitar.

Career with Prince
He met Prince in the late 1970s as Prince was forming his first band for touring.  He started running errands for Prince while working for the man credited with discovering Prince, Owen Husney.  Rivkin's stage name, Bobby Z., was derived from the nickname "Butzie" his grandmother used to call him.

Prince was adamant about having a white drummer in an effort to have a racially diverse band, so Husney implored Prince to audition Rivkin. Rivkin replaced Dale Alexander during the 94East band sessions, prior to Prince moving into his own "For You" album sessions. Dale later became drummer for Prince's protege group Madhouse in 1987. Rivkin was acknowledged in Prince's self-titled album as being a "heaven-sent" helper alongside Andre Cymone. By the time the 1999 album was released, Prince was relying more and more on electronic drums and Rivkin had to adapt his style to operate these in concert as well as the studio, starting with Controversy. He also contributed to Purple Rain, Around the World in a Day, Parade and Sign o' the Times. In 1986 when Wendy & Lisa left The Revolution and the group disbanded after the Parade Tour ended, Prince also took the opportunity to replace Rivkin with Sheila E, daughter of veteran Bay Area drummer and percussionist Pete Escovedo.

Career after Prince and The Revolution
Bobby Z. produced The Suburbs' 1986 self-titled A&M Records album (credited as Robert Brent). In 1988 he produced some tracks for Boy George's album, Tense Nervous Headache. Rivkin helped Wendy & Lisa on their debut album and he released his own self-titled album in 1989 (which included a re-recorded version of "River Run Dry" that he wrote for The Family). Rivkin has since focused more on producing for the recently launched record label branch of Copycats media.

Health problems, recovery and reunions with Prince
Bobby Z. suffered a heart attack in early 2010 and after his recovery made it his mission to continue to raise public awareness of heart attack warning signs and risk factors. He has lobbied Congress for continued research. He set up a fund raising charity called My Purple Heart which went about raising both funds and awareness of heart disease.

In 2011, he celebrated the one-year anniversary of surviving his near-fatal heart attack at First Avenue, with a rare reunion performance of The Revolution—Wendy Melvoin, Lisa Coleman, Brown Mark, Dr. Fink, Dez Dickerson, Eric Leeds and Bobby Z., which raised much needed funds to benefit heart-health awareness,.

The concert, billed as a 'Benefit 2 Celebrate Life!' and presented by Z and the American Heart Association, featured The Revolution, along with heart-health and life-saving information and inspiring stories of survival. The Revolution had not played together since 2003.

His foundation, My Purple Heart, partnered with the American Heart Association again in 2013 to host a benefit concert and weekend block party on March 9, at First Avenue on the 2nd anniversary of his heart attack. Again members of The Revolution appeared alongside Bobby as well as star guests such as Maya Rudolph, local boy and runner up from The Voice Nicholas David, Alexander O'Neal, André Cymone, Dez Dickerson, Dr. Fink and The Roots drummer Questlove. Wendy Melvoin appeared as the resident guitarist for the night's events.

In May 2013, Bobby Z joined Prince on stage during the closing two shows of Prince's whirlwind 3rdeyegirl tour. Both shows took place on the same night with Bobby taking over from Prince's drummer Hannah Welton-Ford. He sat in on both shows for one song. On both occasions it was "Purple Rain". In late May 2013, Bobby appeared alongside former bandmate André Cymone on a web based chat show co-hosted by celebrity blogger Dr.Funkenberry where they both reminisced about their early days on the road with Prince. Bobby also mentioned that it was a thrill to be back onstage with Prince.

Other Projects
Bobby Z hosted a radio show every Sunday on 96.3 K-TWIN in Minneapolis.

Equipment
Drum kit with Prince in the 1980s:
Ludwig kit
Black Simmons SDSV pads
Simmons SDSV Module
Linn LM-1 Drum Machine
LinnDrum Drum Machine
Black Pearl Syncussion pads (x2)
Pearl Syncussion Modules (x2)
Zildjian 14" HiHat
Zildjian 18" Crash
Zildjian 20" Ride
Zildjian 16" Crash

Personal life
Bobby's brothers are film maker Stephen E. Rivkin and fellow Minneapolis musician David Z. He is married to his wife Vicki.

References

Uptown #42. May 31, 2000.

1956 births
Living people
American funk drummers
American male drummers
Record producers from Minnesota
The Revolution (band) members
American rock drummers
Musicians from Minneapolis
Rhythm and blues drummers
Soul drummers
20th-century American drummers
20th-century American male musicians